Israela Margalit is an American concert pianist, recording artist, playwright and television writer.

Career

Musical career 
Israela Margalit is a renowned concert pianist and recording artist, a critically acclaimed playwright, screenwriter, TV writer and author, with awards or honors in all categories, including Gold Medal the New York Film & TV Festival, Prime time EMMY nomination, Best Screenplay the New York Film Awards, Best Thriller Festigious International Film Festival, Best Screenplay/Feature Vegas Movies Awards, Finalist the Tennessee Williams Short Fiction Contest, Best Play Honorable Mention the 14th, 15-minute New York Play Festival, and Best CD the British Music Industry Awards. Her plays have been produced in New York, Moscow, Los Angeles and Hungary. Her TV specials have been shown on PBS, ZDF, ARD and in more than twenty countries. Twenty-four of her short stories have been published in the US and UK. She has appeared as piano soloist with most of the world's great orchestras, and recorded for EMI, DECCA, and Chandos with the London Symphony and the London Philharmonic Orchestras, and the Moscow Philharmonic, as well as solo CD's and the celebrated chamber music series of 20th Century American and British Composers with soloists of the New York Philharmonic and the London Symphony Orchestras, Gramophone's Editor's Choice (Korngold.) In 2021/22 she has won six major film festivals for three different screenplays, and has been officially selected at twenty-three international festivals in the US and Europe for four writing projects (film and TV) and one short film. Her most recent award is a Gold Special Jury Remi Award at WorldFest Houston 55, for her screenplay "Night Blooming Jasmine" (April, 2022.)

She has appeared as a soloist of many of the world's leading orchestras including the Berlin, Munich, London, and Israel Philharmonics and the American Big Five. She has recorded for EMI, DECCA and CHANDOS with the London Symphony, and the London and Moscow Philharmonic Orchestras as well as solo and chamber music, including her critically acclaimed recording of the Brahms First Piano Concerto ("She belongs at the very top, her playing is sensitive, totally sumptuous, brilliant, vital, commanding, and above all crystal clear" (American Record Guide), and the celebrated series of 20th Century American and British composers, of which her recording of works by Korngold, in collaboration with the soloists of the New York Philharmonic Orchestra, won Best CD, the British Music Industry Awards, and was selected as Gramophone Editor's Choice ("A tremendously fine performance. It’s an absolute must".) 
Israela Margalit's Concert tours:
USA, England, Scotland, Germany, Austria, Holland
France, Italy, Hungary, Russia, Mexico, Venezuela
Brazil, Argentina, Israel, India, Singapore, Hong Kong,
Japan.
Israela Margalit has been a soloist with:
The Berlin Philharmonic, The Munich Philharmonic, The London Symphony, The London Philharmonic, London Philharmonia, The New York Philharmonic, The Philadelphia Orchestra, The Boston Symphony, The Chicago Symphony, The Cleveland Orchestra, The Pittsburgh Symphony, The Washington National Orchestra, The Saint Louis Symphony, The Detroit Symphony, The Houston Symphony, The Hamburg Philharmonic, Koeln Guerzenich, The Bonn Philharmonic, The Berlin Radio Orchestra, The Berlin Symphony, The Frankfurt Radio Symphony, The Stuttgart Philharmonic, The Bremen Philharmonic, The Hannover Radio Orchestra, The Vienna Symphony, The Scottish National Orchestra, The Royal Concertgebau Orchestra, The Rotterdam Philharmonic, The French National Orchestra, The Nice Chamber Orchestra, The Santa Cecilia Orchestra, The Rome Radio Symphony, The Milan Radio Symphony, The Moscow Philharmonic Orchestra, The Prague Chamber Orchestra, The Budapest Radio Symphony, The Buenos Aires Philharmonic, The Tokyo Philharmonic, The Jerusalem Radio Orchestra, The Haifa Symphony, The Israel Philharmonic Orchestra.
Her recordings include:
EMI:                                                                                                                                           
The Anglo-American Chamber Music Series, 7 CD's.
With the soloists of The New York Philharmonic Orchestra
Ives
Copland
Barber
Korngold, The British Music Industry Award, Best CD
With the soloists of the London Symphony Orchestras. 
Walton
Elgar
Delius
CHANDOS:                                                                                                                                     
Brahms, Piano Concerto No.1
Mendellsohn, Capriccio Brilliant 
With the London Symphony Orchestra, Bryden Thomson, conductor.                                                                                                                        Schumann, Piano Concerto 
Saint-Seans, Piano Concerto No. 2 
With the London Philharmonic Orchestra, Bryden Thomson, conductor. 
Liszt, Piano Pieces.
Beethoven, Sonatas.
KOCH INT.: 
Schnittke, Piano Concerto No. 2 
Shostakovich, Piano Concerto No. 1
With the Moscow Philharmonic Orchestra, Donald Mara, conductor. 
Shostakovich Three Fantastic Dances, Dances of the Doll
Grieg, Lyrical Pieces.
BLACK BOX:
Rachmaninoff, Concerto No. 2
With the London Symphony Orchestra. Barry Wordsworth, conductor.
HISTORIC RECORDINGS:                                                                                                            
Mozart, Piano Concerto K. 491 in C Minor (live)
With the Rome Radio Orchestra, Lorin Maazel, conductor.
DECCA:                                                                                                                                   
Prokofiev Piano Concerto No 3
With the London New Philharmonia, Lorin Maazel, conductor
Chopin, Piano Concerto No. 1 
With the London New Philharmonia, Lorin Maazel, conductor
Chopin, Piano sonata No 2 in B Flat minor GUILDE de DISQUES:                                                                                                            
Moussorgsky, Pictures of an Exhibition.
TELARC:                                                                                                                                   
Chausson, Concerto for Violin, Piano and String Quartet 
With the soloists of the Cleveland Orchestra and Lorin Maazel, violin.
RESONANCE:
Mozart Quintet for Piano and Wind Instruments
With The soloists of the New York Philharmonic Orchestra
QUARTZ
Chopin, the complete Nocturnes
UNIVERSAL UCJ
Brahms, the complete Hungarian Dances and Waltzes, in four hands
With Ilann Margalit Maazel, piano 4-hands
Romantic Piano Favorites
QRV
Schumann Davidsbündlertänze Op. 6
Brahms Rhapsodies Op. 79

Writing career 
In 2021 and 2022 Israela Margalit broke film festivals records by getting officially selected to 19 festivals, and winning 4 awards. (Ref. Filmfreeway>) That included:
WHAT KIND OF WOMAN, a screenplay by Israela Margalit: Winner: New York Film Awards, Best screenplay – features. Winner: Vegas Movie Awards, Best Screenplay / Feature. Winner: Vegas Movie Awards, Best Screenwriter, Feature. Nominated: 5th Annual New York Film Awards Best Screenplay
Official Selections: Vegas Movie Awards; Berlin Independent Art Film; Toronto Women Film Festival:
FEEDBACK Female Film Festival (FFFF); London New Wave Film Festival. 
NIGHT BLOOMING JASMINE, screenplay by Israela Margalit (based on her play.) Winner: FilmCon Awards, LA, Honorary Mention Screenplays; Finalist:  Vancouver Independent Film Festival, Best Screenplay, Drama; Semifinalist: Florida Script Challenge, Best Drama Feature, Screenplays. 
CALLING CARD, a screenplay by Israela Margalit. Winner: Festigious Film Festival LA Best Thriller Screenplay; Semifinalist: LA Film Awards (LAFA), Best Thriller Screenplay. Official Selections Festigious Film Festival; FilmCon Film Festival; Thriller/Suspense Festival; Santa Monica Shorts;
New York Independent Cinema Awards.
ON THE BENCH, a short screenplay by Israela Margalit: Winner Best Screenplay Vienna Indie Short Film Festival;Official Selection Venice Shorts.
CROSSROADS, a 47m streaming show (6 plays about love, pain and hope) by Israela Margalit> Semifinalist: IndieX Film Fest, LA, Best Short Film. Nominated Best Film,Independent Shorts Awards. 
Official Selection Independent Shorts Awards
SEX TODAY, LOVE TOMORROW, A TV comedy series pilot, written by Israela Margalit and James Harmon BrowN, based on Israela Margalit's plays 3 O’clock in Brooklyn, and Rendezvous.  Official Selections Toronto Indie Shorts Festival; Cannes International Cinema Festival.
(Source material, announcements by all the above-mentioned festivals.)
HER TV SPECIALS INCLUDE:
The Well-Tempered Bach with Peter Ustinov
A two-hour PBS Special, produced by Oregon Public Broadcasting, Wisconsin Public Television, Deutsche Welle, Transtel.
Prime time Emmy nomination.
Celebrating Haydn with Sir Peter Ustinov
A two-hour PBS Special. Produced by Oregon Public Broadcasting, Wisconsin Public Television, EuroArts, SAT 3, ORF, and Transtel.
Gold Medal, the New York Film and Television Festival.
National Education Association Media Award.
The Mozart Mystique with Sir Peter Ustinov
A two-hour PBS Special, produced by Oregon Public Broadcasting, Wisconsin Public Television, SAT 3, Deutsche Welle, Transtel.
National Education Association Media Award.
The Immortal Beethoven with Peter Ustinov
A two-hour PBS Special, produced by Oregon Public Broadcasting, Wisconsin Public Television, Deutsche Welle, Transtel. 
"Part biography, part performance, and part career analysis, (it’s) a
first-rate production".
(The Mozart Mystique)
Variety International

"An intriguing portrait. Perhaps the real star is Israela Margalit, who wrote the fresh, provocative script, and offers jolts of genuine Beethovenian spirit in her performance".
(The Immortal Beethoven)
USA Today
"Mozart had his due with Amadeus. Now it’s Beethoven’s turn to get his due. (A) superb bio narrated by Peter Ustinov at his classiest and written by Israela Margalit, one of the many musicians who add just the right amount of wonderful music to these two hours".
(The Immortal Beethoven)
People Magazine

"A superlative rich script by Israela Margalit"
(The Immortal Beethoven)
The Washington Post

Classic Changes from Rubinsten to Shostakovich to Schnittke
A one-hour television special, produced by Moonlight Productions
and Music and More, Inc.
Finalist The Long Island Film & Video festival.

Beethoven, the Prodigy, the Titan
A one-hour television special, produced by Arts & Entertainment.
Selected for permanent display at the New York Museum of Broadcasting.
"We regard (this program) among the very cream of the Arts & Entertainment crop".
Curtis Davis, vice-president, Programming, Arts & Entertainment

Clara
A one-hour drama special, produced by ZDF.
Selected as one of the ten best television programs of the year by
Bild und Funk. 
"A wonderful gift for music lovers. Exceptional artistic talent.
Her playing is impressive".
Bild Und Funk

Crossroads 
 6 short plays by Israela Margalit about love, pain, and hope. 
Directed by John Martin Green and Israela Margalit.
Streamed on YouTube and Eventbrite, 2020.
Semifinalist, IndieX Film Fest, LA, Best Short Film 2021
Finalist Independent Short Awards, 2021

According to one account, Margalit became a writer by accident, when she spoke to concert audiences about the backstory of the music she had been playing. That morphed into a one-hour television program in Germany about Clara Schumann, which achieved high ratings. She turned to writing plays, often about music and musicians as well as romance. Her play Night Blooming Jasmine focused on ethnic strife in northern Israel. Her 3 O’Clock in Brooklyn looked at romantic issues in modern New York City. In New York City, she was friends with playwright Arthur Miller and his wife. She said:

Her play Beethoven, The Prodigy, The Titan was broadcast on the A&E Channel, and was chosen to be displayed permanently at the Museum of Broadcasting in New York. She wrote The Mozart Mystique and Celebrating Haydn which were shown in countries worldwide; her play The Well-Tempered Bach was nominated for an Emmy award. Her full-length plays Night Blooming Jasmine, 3 O’clock in Brooklyn and Presumed Guilty were produced Off-Broadway. Her short play On the Bench won an Honorary Mention Best Play in the 14th annual New York 15-Minute Play Festival. Trio explored romantic themes; a review in the Santa Monica Daily Press described it as a "must-see" for those who like romantic drama, "immortal music", and Jane Austen, and that it was "filled with pithy comments and starchy 19th century speechifying."

A Los Angeles Times theater critic wrote that Trio was liked by Russian audiences but that its "clanking script" at the Hollywood premiere "merely inspires head-scratching". In contrast, theater critic Sarah Goodrum found the play to be a "delicate balance between history and creative risk-taking" and found it to be "wholly successful."

In 2011, her loosely autobiographical play First Prize explored the darker side of the classical music world, which she portrayed as "sordid and soul-destroying," according to one review.

In 2017, Margalit published a short story "Too Much" in the anthology "Life Dances", edited by Trevor Maynard.

Personal life 
Israela Margalit is a mother of two from her marriage to conductor Lorin Maazel: Ilann Margalit Maazel, a civil rights lawyer, pianist and an award-winning composer, and Fiona Maazel, an award-winning novelist. She Studied music in Tel-Aviv, Paris and Munich. While she took a few years' sabbatical from concertizing to care for her small children, she studied philosophy, political science and literature at Case Western Reserve. She's a recipient of an Honorary Doctorate for Humane Letters from Lake Erie College. She speaks Hebrew, English, French and German, and writes in English. She was born in Israel and lives in New York.

References 

Living people
Year of birth missing (living people)
People from Haifa
Musicians from New York (state)
American people of Israeli descent
American pianists
American women pianists
Jewish classical pianists
Jewish American dramatists and playwrights
American women dramatists and playwrights
21st-century American Jews
21st-century American women